Thamnobryum fernandesii is a species of moss in the family Neckeraceae. It is endemic to Madeira in Portugal, where it is known from just a few locations. It grows in wet habitats, such as waterfalls and drip zones.

References

Flora of Madeira
Endemic flora of Madeira
Neckeraceae
Endangered plants
Taxonomy articles created by Polbot